Victor Daniel Gojçaj (pronounced 'Goy-Chai) (born March 9, 1983) is an Albanian American actor. He is from Traboin, Tuzi, Montenegro.

Career
Gojcaj was spotted by film director Tony Scott while he was searching New York for ex-criminals to play the roles of the train hijackers, alongside John Travolta in the 2009 movie The Taking of Pelham 123. Scott enlisted the help of Drug Enforcement Administration agent Don Ferrarone to search through mug shots.  He was later scripted into Scott's following movie of Unstoppable.

Filmography

References

External links

1983 births
Living people
Male actors from Detroit
American people of Albanian descent
American male film actors
21st-century American male actors